A mail bag or mailbag can be one of several types of bags used for collecting or carrying different types of postal material. 

A mailbag throughout the United States history has been called various names depending on its form and function at the time, some of which are now obsolete. Among these names are mail sack, mail satchel, mail pouch, catcher pouch, mochila, and portmanteau.

Types 
The U.S. National Postal Museum says that any bag that carries mail (for example, letters, magazines, advertisement brochures, packages) is defined as a mailbag. A mailbag is called a postbag in England. The form and structure of mailbags has implications for fatigue and industrial injuries to mail carriers.

Mail sacks 

A mail sack is a lower security class mailbag used to carry second-class, third-class, and fourth-class mail. It does not have a locking mechanism with it.

Mail satchel 

A mail satchel is a device letter carriers use over-the-shoulder for assisting the delivery of personal mail to businesses and homes.

Mail pouch 

A mail pouch is a strong material (e.g., canvas) mail bag designed to lock at the top to prevent access into the bag. They are usually used for transporting First-class and registered mail to and from different post offices. Mail pouches also carry military domestic and military airmail.

Catcher pouch 

A catcher pouch was a mail bag used only by the Railway Post Office in exchanging mail when the train did not stop at the town. It was most popular in the late nineteenth century and the early twentieth century.

Mochila 

A mochila was a removable lightweight leather cover put over a horse saddle for carrying mail and was used by the Pony Express.

See also 

 Diplomatic bag
 Messenger bag
 Owney (dog)

References

Further reading

 

Bags
Philatelic terminology
Postal history
Postal services
Postal systems
United States Postal Service